Junior Boy's Own is an English record label specialising in electronic dance music. Underworld, The Chemical Brothers and X-Press 2 are its most successful artists.

History
The origins of the label go back to 1987, when a group of young clubbers started a fanzine named Boys Own, inspired by a similar fanzine for Liverpool football fans called The End, edited by future singer of The Farm, Peter Hooton. The Boys Own crew, consisting of Terry Farley, Andrew Weatherall, Cymon Eckel and Steven Hall, knew fellow Chelsea fan Paul Oakenfold and through their connections with him they were invited to the early acid house club nights that Oakenfold was holding in London.

As the crew began to become more involved in clubbing, the fanzine began to cover the nascent scene, becoming its key chronicler and influencing a wave of similar fanzines across the country. In 1988 they began hosting their own outdoor raves,  and in 1990 they formed Boy's Own Recordings (1990–1993)with London Records/FFRR. In 1992 Farley and Hall formed an independent label Junior Recordings Ltd., which started to use the name Junior Boy's Own.
The label was run by Steven Hall with a/r shared by Hall and Terry Farley,Farley focusing on 12" house releases and his own productions with Pete Heller and Hall signing album orientated live acts including The Chemical Brothers,The Black Science Orchestra and Underworld.During the late 90's the label split in two with 12" vinyl dance tracks being released by Junior London and album projects through Hall's join venture label JBO which partnered Richard Branson's V2 and Parlophone/EMI.

Artists

Selected discography
Second Toughest in the Infants, Underworld, 1996.
Dig Your Own Hole, The Chemical Brothers, 1997.
Phantom Theory, Futureshock, 2003.

References

Sources

External links
 Junior Boy's Own at Discogs
 The Story of Boy's Own

British record labels
Record labels established in 1990
English electronic dance music record labels